Marinna Teal (born November 25, 1975), better known as Strings, is an American rapper and songwriter formerly signed to Epic and Cash Money Records. She is best known for being featured on R. Kelly's "Gotham City Remix" and Keith Sweat's "Im Not Ready Remix" in the mid and late 1990s.

Early life
Her grandfather was Aaron Moore, a famous bluesman from Chicago. When growing up, Strings begin singing in the choir in her hometown and won talent show prizes. She had her first baby at 13. After graduating from Chicago Vocational High School she moved to Oklahoma City for five years, where she became an exotic dancer to support her daughter.

Music career
One night when she was out of town she attended an R. Kelly concert she had got her way backstage, where she met R. Kelly she sang for him then when she was done singing R. Kelly took her to a restroom and start beating on a sink while she was rapping for hours. Then one night she got a phone call and it was Kelly he wanted her to fly to Miami to record some songs that she had written. When everything went well, Strings signed to R. Kelly's label Rockland Records and appeared on R. Kelly's "Gotham City Remix". She also performed vocals on his self titled album and appeared on Sparkle's "Vegas" on her self titled album. Strings later left Rockland because they didn't release her solo album. She later signed a deal to Keith Sweat's record label Epic in 1998.

In 1999 she released "Raise It Up", and "Tongue Song" in 2000, which sampled Sisqo's hit "Thong Song". Tongue Song made it to number 24 on the Billboard Bubbling Under R&B/Hip-Hop Singles chart and number 13 on Billboard Hot Rap Singles chart. The song received regular airplay on East Coast radio stations, and she performed two singles on Soul Train and on BET Live from LA. The album's release date was scheduled for November 2000, however it was shelved, and only the Listening Post Edition (Promo CD) and sampler copies were pressed. She was later released from her contract with Epic.

When she was a free agent she signed to Cash Money Records, and later changed her name to Tateeze. She was featured on the Big Tymers single Oh Yeah!. She planned to release another solo project under their label, but due to Hurricane Katrina it was never released, and two weeks later she left the label.

In 2011 she released her debut Mixtape entitled High Maintenance Music 101 The Mixx Education of Strings.

Discography

Albums
 2000: The Black Widow

Singles

Album appearances
 1998: "Vegas" Sparkle - Sparkle 
 1999: "Im Not Ready Remix" Keith Sweat - Im Not Ready
 2000: "Whatcha Like" Keith Sweat - Didn't See Me Coming
 2002: "Get That Dough" Lil Wayne - 500 Degreez 
 2002: "Do That...." Baby - Birdman 
 2002: "Oh Yeah!" Big Tymers - Hood Rich 
 2003: "Beat It Up" Big Tymers - Big Money Heavyweight 
 2003: "Chi-Town" Boo & Gotti - Perfect Timing 
 2004: "Beat It Up" Big Tymers - No Love (Beautiful Life) 
 2004: "Shake That A**" Mannie Fresh - The Mind of Mannie Fresh
 2005: "Smoke Out" - Birdman - Fast Money 
 2005: "Addiction" - Kanye West - Late Registration
 2009: "Dope Money" D Boyz - Life Of A D-Boy

Mixtapes

References

External links
 
  
 
 

Living people
1975 births
American women rappers
African-American women rappers
Chicago Vocational High School alumni
African-American women singer-songwriters
African-American songwriters
American female erotic dancers
American erotic dancers
Hardcore hip hop artists
Epic Records artists
Cash Money Records artists
Midwest hip hop musicians
Rappers from Chicago
21st-century American rappers
21st-century American women musicians
21st-century African-American women
21st-century African-American musicians
20th-century African-American people
Singer-songwriters from Illinois
20th-century African-American women
21st-century women rappers